Angela Douglas (born 1940) is an English actress.

Angela Douglas may also refer to:
 Angela E. Douglas (born 1956), British entomologist
 Angela Lynn Douglas (1943–2007), American transgender activist